Marko Kovačević (born 9 May 1988) is a Montenegrin Serb politician serving as the Mayor of Nikšić since 10 May 2021 and the spokesperson of the New Serb Democracy. Prior to this he was a member of the Parliament of Montenegro.

Biography

Early life and education
Kovačević was born on 9 May 1988 to a Montenegrin Serb family in Nikšić, at that time part of SR Montenegro and SFR Yugoslavia. He graduated from the Faculty of Law at the University of Montenegro.

Political career
After graduating from the University of Montenegro, Kovačević joined the New Serb Democracy, an ethnic Serb political party in Montenegro and became a member of the Municipal Assembly of Nikšić in two convocations and member of the Committee for Statute and Regulations of the Municipal Assembly of Nikšić. He also serves as the spokesperson of the party.

In 2019, Kovačević attended the unveiling and consecration of the monument to the Chetnik leader Draža Mihailović in Ravna Gora Park in Bileća, Republika Srpska, Bosnia and Herzegovina.

During the 2019-2020 clerical protests in Montenegro, Kovačević was arrested in Nikšić for waving a Serb tricolor. Kovačević received the 22nd position on the For the Future of Montenegro electoral list for the 2020 Montenegrin parliamentary elections and was elected member of the Parliament of Montenegro. Following the confirmation of his MP mandate, Kovačević was elected president of the Parliamentary Legislative Committee, member of the Committee on Education, Science, Culture and Sports, and member the Anti-Corruption Committee. Kovačević's opponents have labelled him a Serbian nationalist, a supporter of the Greater Serbia project and a follower of the Chetnik ideology. He was a ballot holder of the For the Future of Nikšić coalition (DF-SNP) at the 2021 Nikšić municipal elections as the coalition's mayor candidate. On 10 May 2021, he was elected Mayor of Nikšić, replacing Milutin Simović.

References 

Living people
1988 births
Serbs of Montenegro
University of Montenegro Faculty of Law alumni
New Serb Democracy politicians
Members of the Parliament of Montenegro
Politicians from Nikšić
Mayors of places in Montenegro
Serbian nationalists